Phoning Home is a collection of autobiographical essays by Jacob Appel, published in 2014 by the University of South Carolina Press.  The collection won the New Haven Prize in 2014 and a finalist for the Housatonic Book Award in 2015.

Four of the essays were previously short-listed for The Best American Essays in the years 2007, 2011, 2012, and 2013.  Essays in the collection had earlier been published in Massachusetts Review, Briar Cliff Review, Georgetown Review, Midstream, Tiferet, Southwest Review, Passages North, North Dakota Quarterly, Alligator Juniper, Southeast Review, Kenyon Review, CutBank and Chattahoochee Review.

Reception 

Girija Sankar, reviewing the volume for New Pages, wrote that "Phoning Home is a worthy addition to the pantheon of great American essays and Appel proves himself to be an astute observer and chronicler of the modern human condition."  Bryan Monte in Amsterdam Quarterly wrote, "What makes Appel’s essays so interesting and unique is his candid, statistical or professional approach and/or non-melodramatic description of his relatives’ experience."

Contents 

 Phoning Home  
 Two Cats, Fat & Thin  
 Mr. Odd & Mr. Even   
 An Absence of Jell-O  
 She Loves Me Not  
 Opting Out  
 Charming & Devoted    
 Livery  
 The Man Who Was Not My Grandfather  
 Caesura:  Antwerp, 1938  
 Our Incredible Shrinking Discourse  
 Divided Expectations  
 Sudden Death:  A Eulogy

References

2014 non-fiction books
Autobiographies
American essay collections